Giovanni Battista Spiriti was a Roman Catholic prelate who served as Coadjutor of the Bishop of Cesena (1545–1556).

Biography
On 27 November 1545, at the age of 24, while still a student at Perugia, Giovanni Battista Spiriti was appointed Coadjutor to the Bishop of Cesena, with the right of succession, by Pope Paul III. The diocese was then held by Giovanni Battista's uncle, Bishop Cristoforo Spiriti. Battista Spiriti administered the diocese until his resignation on 5 November 1556, the date of the death of his uncle.

References 

16th-century Italian Roman Catholic archbishops
Bishops appointed by Pope Paul III